Bizkarreta-Gerendiain (Spanish: Viscarret-Guerendiáin) is a village located in the Erro municipality of Navarre, The French Way of the Camino de Santiago passes through the town.

References

Populated places in Navarre